The  New York Giants season was the franchise's 5th season in the National Football League. The team finished with a 13-1-1 record, good for second place. Their +226 point differential is the best in the history of the New York Giants. They won by 15 points or more six times.

Schedule

Standings

See also
List of New York Giants seasons

External links
1929 New York Giants season at Pro Football Reference

New York Giants seasons
New York Giants
New York Giants
1920s in Manhattan
Washington Heights, Manhattan